Gober may refer to:

 Hershel W. Gober (born 1936), former acting United States Secretary of Veterans Affairs
 Robert Gober (born 1954), American sculptor
 Gober Sosebee (1915-1996), American racecar driver
 Gober, Texas, United States, an unincorporated community

See also
 Gober Chalk, a geologic formation in Texas